SN 2007sr was a Type Ia supernova event that happened in the galaxy NGC 4038. It was announced on December 18, 2007, but was visible on images beginning December 7. It peaked at magnitude 12.7 on December 14.

References

External links
 Light curves and spectra on the Open Supernova Catalog
 Simbad
 SN 2007sr

Supernova remnants
Supernovae
Corvus (constellation)